Thomas Nicholas Cullen (born 4 January 1992) is an Australian-English professional cricketer. He is right-handed batsman and wicketkeeper for Glamorgan County Cricket Club. He made his first-class debut for Cardiff MCC University against Gloucestershire in April 2015. He made his Twenty20 debut on 18 June 2021, for Glamorgan in the 2021 T20 Blast. He made his List A debut on 22 July 2021, for Glamorgan in the 2021 Royal London One-Day Cup.

References

External links

1992 births
Living people
Australian cricketers
Cardiff MCCU cricketers
Glamorgan cricketers
English cricketers
Australian emigrants to England